Rhinodia rostraria is a moth of the family Geometridae first described by Achille Guenée in 1857. It is found in Australia, including Tasmania.

External links
Australian Faunal Directory

Caberini
Moths of Australia
Moths described in 1857